Turning Point is an ABC News program that aired from 1994 to 1999.

Turning Point was an hour-long documentary program focused on a single topic, making it similar to CBS' 48 Hours, which it ran directly opposite for some of its run.  The program tended toward sensational topics, such as former members of Charles Manson's "Family" and much coverage of the O. J. Simpson murder case, which was current for much of the program's run.  ABC News figures appearing regularly on the program included Diane Sawyer, Forrest Sawyer, Meredith Vieira, Peter Jennings and Barbara Walters.

This Turning Point is not to be confused with an ABC dramatic anthology series of the same title which ran during the 1952-53 television season.

References

 Brooks, Tim and Marsh, Earle, The Complete Directory to Prime Time Network and Cable TV Shows

1990s American television news shows
1994 American television series debuts
1999 American television series endings
ABC News
American Broadcasting Company original programming